The Academy Decides is a 1937 British drama film directed by John Baxter and starring April Vivian, Henry Oscar, John Oxford and Wensley Russell. It was made at Shepperton Studios as a quota quickie.

Cast
 Henry Oscar as Kyle  
 April Vivian as Mary  
 John Oxford
 Wensley Russell
 Boris Ranevsky 
 Frank Birch 
Walter Tobias

References

Bibliography
 Chibnall, Steve. Quota Quickies: The Birth of the British 'B' Film. British Film Institute, 2007.
 Low, Rachael. Filmmaking in 1930s Britain. George Allen & Unwin, 1985.
 Wood, Linda. British Films, 1927-1939. British Film Institute, 1986.

External links

1937 films
1930s English-language films
1937 drama films
British drama films
British black-and-white films
Quota quickies
Films shot at Shepperton Studios
1930s British films